Aranđel Todorović (Serbian Cyrillic: Аранђел Тодоровић; born 22 September 1955) is a Serbian retired professional footballer who played as a midfielder.

Todorović represented Yugoslavia at the 1974 UEFA European Under-18 Championship.

Honours
Partizan
 Yugoslav First League: 1975–76

References

External links
 
 

Association football midfielders
Expatriate footballers in France
FC Martigues players
FC Sète 34 players
FK Partizan players
FK Rad players
Ligue 2 players
NK Osijek players
Serbian footballers
Footballers from Belgrade
Yugoslav expatriate footballers
Yugoslav expatriates in France
Yugoslav First League players
Yugoslav footballers
1955 births
Living people